Dasi may refer to:

Places

Mainland China
 Dasi, Qinzhou (大寺镇), town in Qinbei District, Qinzhou, Guangxi
 Dasi, Taizhou, Jiangsu (大泗镇), town in Gaogang District, Taizhou, Jiangsu
 Dasi, Tianjin (大寺镇), town in Xiqing District, Tianjin
 Dasi Township, Fengqing County (大寺乡), in Fengqing County, Yunnan

Taiwan
 Daxi District (大溪區), a district in Taoyuan City
 Dasi Station (大溪車站), a railway station in Toucheng Town, Yilan County

Other
 Dashi, also known as dasi, a Japanese soup stock
 Digital Array Scanned Interferometer, or DASI, a scientific instrument for the NASA ERAST Project
 Degree Angular Scale Interferometer, or DASI, telescope located in Antarctica
 Binodini Dasi (1862–1941), Calcutta-based, Bengali-speaking actress and thespian
 Malati Dasi, senior spiritual leader on the International Society for Krishna Consciousness
 Grand Master Dashi, a character from the anime series Xiaolin Showdown
 Das Dasi or Dasdasi, an Iranian adaptation of Oobi (TV series)